RJA can refer to

 Rajahmundry Airport, the IATA code for the airport in India
 The Red Jumpsuit Apparatus, a post-hardcore band from Middleburg, Florida
 RJA&HS, Royal Jersey Agricultural and Horticultural Society
 ICAO designator for Royal Jordanian, a Jordanian airline